The Sensorama was a machine that is one of the earliest known examples of immersive, multi-sensory (now known as multimodal) technology. This technology, which was introduced in 1962 by Morton Heilig, is considered one of the earliest virtual reality (VR) systems.

Development 
Heilig, who today would be thought of as a "multimedia" specialist, in the 1950s saw theater as an activity that could encompass all the senses in an effective manner, thus drawing the viewer into the onscreen activity. He dubbed it "Experience Theater", and detailed his vision of multi-sensory theater in a 1955 paper, "The Cinema of the Future" (Robinett 1994). In 1962 he built a prototype of his vision, dubbed the Sensorama, along with five short films for it to display. 

The Sensorama was a mechanical device, which includes a stereoscopic color display, fans, odor emitters, stereo‐sound system, and a motional chair. It simulated a motorcycle ride through New York and created the experience by having the spectator sit in an imaginary motorcycle while experiencing the street through the screen, fan-generated wind, and the simulated noise and smell of the city. These elements are triggered at the appropriate time such as the case of the release of the exhaust chemicals when rider approached a bus. The petrol fumes and the smell of pizza snack bars were recreated by chemicals. While the machine still functions today, audiences cannot interact with it and it cannot respond based on the user's actions.  

Howard Rheingold (in his 1991 book Virtual Reality) spoke of his trial of the Sensorama using a short film piece that detailed a bicycle ride through Brooklyn, created in the 1950s, and still seemed quite impressed by what it could do more than 40 years later. The Sensorama was able to display stereoscopic 3-D images in a wide-angle view, provide body tilting, supply stereo sound, and also had tracks for wind and aromas to be triggered during the film. Heilig was unable to obtain financial backing for his visions and patents, and so the Sensorama work was halted.

See also
The Sensorium, the world's first commercial "4D film"

References
 Heilig M. (1962). US Patent #3,050,870
 Rheingold, H. (1991). Virtual Reality, Simon & Schuster, New York, N.Y.
 Robinett, W. (1994). "Interactivity and Individual Viewpoint in Shared Virtual Worlds: The Big Screen vs. Networked Personal Displays." Computer Graphics, 28 (2), 127.

Specific

External links
 medienkunstnetz.de article

Products introduced in 1962
Multimodal interaction
Virtual reality